Heard County High School is a public high school in Franklin, Georgia, United States, part of the Heard County School District. The school's mascot is the Brave.

References

Public high schools in Georgia (U.S. state)
Education in Heard County, Georgia